Netaji Subhas University of Technology (West Campus)   is a public engineering institute located in Jaffarpur kalan, Delhi, India 110073. 

It was established by the Department of Training and Technical Education, Government of National Capital Territory of Delhi in 2007 and was named after the first Chief Minister of Delhi. Engineering College no longer exists and its campus has been acquired byNetaji Subhas University of Technology, a state university established by the Government of NCT of Delhi, as its West Campus to run specialised engineering courses since September 2020. It has three branches right now i.e., Civil Engineering, Mechanical Engineering and Geoinformatics.

History
The college was inaugurated by the Former Chief Minister of Delhi Smt. Sheila Dikshit in 2007. In comparison to the sanctioned intake in degree-level courses of engineering in metropolitan cities, Delhi had the lowest intake compared to Bengaluru, Mumbai, Chennai and Pune. 

The college plans to offer graduate, postgraduate, and doctoral programs in Engineering and Science and to enrol 2,000 students. The Government of NCT of Delhi had approved the creation of a Center of Advanced Studies and Research for Disaster Mitigation Management, Environmental Monitoring and Forecasting, on the campus of the college.

References

External links
 Official website
 

All India Council for Technical Education
Educational institutions established in 2007
Engineering colleges in Delhi
Universities in Delhi
2007 establishments in Delhi